Coach & Bus Week (CBW) is the only paid-for weekly trade magazine for the road passenger transport industry in the United Kingdom. It is available by subscription, from main branches of WHSmith and from some independent newsagents. The magazine is based in Peterborough.

History and profile
Coach & Bus Week was established in 1978. The magazine had half its roots with the founding in Hull by former coach proprietor Terry Beanland of Coachmart. Its most prolific journalist was Ray Pearson, who covered all technical aspects, including road tests and tourism topics. The weekly magazine was purchased by EMAP and moved to Peterborough. The publisher was EMAP Response (later renamed EMAP Automotive), which purchased Bus Business from Landor Publishing in 1989. In 1992, following a downturn in advertising revenue as a result of the recession, EMAP closed Bus Business and Coachmart. In their place, it launched Coach and Bus Week. The first weekly issue was published on 22 February 1992. The Editor in chief was Mark Barton, the News and technical editor was Richard Simpson, the Features editor was Mike Morgan, and the Tourism editor was Mark Williams. The long-term editor of the magazine during this period was Mike Morgan, who left the post in August 2003. EMAP sold the title to Rouncy Media Ltd in 2005. Rouncy was wound up by Court Order. The magazine has been published by Coach and Bus Week Limited since 2012.Former editors Gareth Evans and James Day left the magazine in May 2018 and April 2020 respectively. The current editor is Richard Sharman.

Regular features include News, Coach News, Bus News, International News, Regional News, Drivers' Pages, Industry, Operator Profiles, Test Drives, Technical and Product/Services features, Open Platform, Deliveries, People News and Recruitment

It is linked with Group Travel World, a monthly magazine for the group travel industry. As well as being sent to all full subscribers of Coach & Bus Week, Group Travel World has its own paid subscription list and is published by GTW Media Limited.

References

External links

1978 establishments in the United Kingdom
Transport magazines published in the United Kingdom
Weekly magazines published in the United Kingdom
Bus transport
Magazines established in 1978
Mass media in Peterborough
Professional and trade magazines